RDOS may refer to:

Regional District of Okanagan-Similkameen, a regional district of British Columbia
Data General RDOS, a real-time operating system by Data General since 1972
Cromemco RDOS, the resident operating system on some Cromenco S-100 cards
RDOS (Microsoft), a name sometimes used for the Russian versions of MS-DOS 4.01 and 5.00
RDOS (Ekblad), a 32-bit DOS-compatible operating system by Leif Ekblad since 1988

See also
DOS (disambiguation)
ROS (disambiguation)
RTOS, real-time operating system
REAL/32